Mary Ann Shaffer (née Fiery; December 13, 1934 – February 16, 2008) was an American writer, editor, librarian, and a bookshop worker. She is noted for her posthumously published work The Guernsey Literary and Potato Peel Pie Society, which she wrote with her niece, Annie Barrows.

Biography
Mary Ann Fiery was born on December 13, 1934, in Martinsburg, West Virginia. She had an older sister, Cynthia. They were raised in nearby Romney, West Virginia, but moved back to Martinsburg and went to high school there. Mary Ann was an alumna of Miami University in Oxford, Ohio. She married Carl Richard Shaffer in 1956, and in 1958 they moved to California, where they raised two daughters, Morgan and Liz. She worked in the public libraries of San Anselmo, Larkspur, and San Rafael during her career. She also worked as an editor at Harper & Row, and as a bookseller at bookstores in Larkspur and Corte Madera. She died at her home in San Anselmo, California on February 16, 2008.

References

1934 births
2008 deaths
21st-century American novelists
American book editors
American historical novelists
American librarians
American women librarians
American women novelists
Writers from Martinsburg, West Virginia
People from Romney, West Virginia
Novelists from West Virginia
21st-century American women writers
20th-century American novelists
20th-century American women writers
Women historical novelists
People from San Anselmo, California
Novelists from California
Librarians from West Virginia